= Xmulzencab =

Xmulzencab are a group of Maya bee deities.
